Lin Carter's Flashing Swords! #6 is an anthology of fantasy stories in the sword and sorcery subgenre, edited by Robert M. Price. It was first published in trade paperback and ebook by Pulp Hero Press in July 2020, but was delisted by the publisher shortly after publication. A second edition with substantially different content was published in hardcover and trade paperback by Timaios Press in January 2021.

Summary
The original edition collects twelve stories, eleven original and one previously published, by eleven authors, together with an introduction by Price. The second edition collects ten stories by eleven authors, together with Price's revised introduction. Only three stories are carried over from the first edition, while the remainder are new; the final piece is a graphic novella.

Contents (first edition)
"Introduction" (Robert M. Price)
"The Island of Shadows" (Paul R. McNamee)
"Godkiller" (Cliff Biggers)
"Varla and the Mad Magician" (Glen Usher and Steve Lines)
"Blood Games in the Temple of the Toad" (Frank Schildiner)
"The Bloody Crooked One" (Charles R. Rutledge)
"The Lion of Valentia" (Steve Dilks)
"Immortals of Lemuria" (Robert M. Price)
"The Tower in the Crimson Mist" (Adrian Cole)
"Bellico and the Tower of Mouths" (Richard Toogood)
"The Emerald Tablet" (Robert M. Price) (from Strange Sorcery no. 24, August 2017)
"Tale of the Uncrowned Kings" (Steve Dilks)
"A Twisted Branch of Yggdrasil" (D.M. Ritzlin)

Contents (second edition)

Italicized pieces were carried over from the first edition; all others are new to the second edition.
"Flashing Words" (introduction) (Robert M. Price)
"A Prince of Mars" (Lin Carter and Robert M. Price)
"Curse of the White Witch" (Wayne Judge)
"Bellico and the Tower of Mouths" (Richard Toogood)
"Immortals of Lemuria" (Robert M. Price)
"The Vanishing Conjurer" (Glynn Owen Barrass)
"World of the Black Sun" (Pierre V. Comtois)
"Boscastle and the Swamp Enchantress" (Jason Ross Cummings)
"Varla and the Mad Magician" (Steve Lines and Glen M. Usher)
"Hercules versus the Cyclops" (Santiago del Dardano Turann)
"Tonga of Lemuria" (Clayton L. Hinkle)

Controversy
As literary executor of Lin Carter, who was the editor behind the Flashing Swords! anthology series of the 1970s/1980s, Robert M. Price projected the book as a revival and continuation of the original series. A controversy erupted on publication due to Price's introduction, in which he criticizes feminism and the concept of rape culture. Contributing authors Cliff Biggers, Frank Schildiner, Charles R. Rutledge, and Paul R. McNamee all publicly withdrew their contributions in protest, stating that Price did not preview the introduction with them before publication, with publisher Pulp Hero Press delisted the book a few days after publication. 

Price stated an intention to take the project to a different publisher, without the withdrawn stories and with the addition of new ones, an intention realized with the appearance of the second edition in January, 2021. It was, however, essentially a different work, lacking nine of the original version's twelve stories while adding seven.

Reception
Reviewing the second edition at castaliahouse.com, Morgan Holmes characterizes the book as "a retro-sort of anthology with a number of vintage characters in new adventures by new writers. ... So, if you want to read new adventures of Thongor, Elak, and Ki-Gor, Flashing Swords #6 will scratch that itch."

Relation to other works
Before producing the two editions of Flashing Swords! #6, Price  edited a similar Sword and Sorcery anthology, The Mighty Warriors (Ulthar Press, 2018), showcasing some of the same authors whose works appeared in the first edition. In fact, according to Price, the first version of Flashing Swords! #6 was originally envisioned as a direct follow-up to The Mighty Warriors to be titled The Mighty Adventurers; he attributes the suggestion to instead bill it as a revival of the Flashing Swords series to Pulp Hero Press publisher Bob McLain.

Of the stories slated for the original version of Flashing Swords! #6 that were not carried over into the revised version, D. M. Ritzlin's "A Twisted Branch of Yggdrasil" was subsequently published in his collection Necromancy in Nilztiria (DMR Books, 2020), while Adrian Cole's "The Tower in the Crimson Mist" and Steve Dilks's "Tale of the Uncrowned Kings" were subsequently published in the anthology Savage Scrolls, Volume One (Pulp Hero Press, 2020).

Notes

2020 anthologies
2021 anthologies
Fantasy anthologies
Heroic fantasy